Gerben Kuypers (born 1 February 2000) is a Belgian cyclist, who currently rides for UCI Continental team . He finished sixth in the elite race at the 2023 UCI Cyclo-cross World Championships.

Major results

Cyclo-cross

2016–2017
 1st Junior Zonnebeke
 Junior Soudal Classics
2nd Niel
 3rd Junior Mol
2017–2018
 Junior Soudal Classics
1st Neerpelt
2nd Leuven
3rd Niel
 1st Junior Mol
 Junior DVV Trophy
2nd Hamme
 Junior Brico Cross
2nd Meulebeke
2019–2020
 Under-23 DVV Trophy
2nd Ronse
3rd Koppenberg
2021–2022
 Under-23 X²O Badkamers Trophy
3rd Hamme
 Under-23 Coupe de France
3rd Pierric
2022–2023
 1st Overall Coupe de France
1st Nommay I
1st Nommay II
1st Camors I
1st Camors II
1st Troyes I
3rd Troyes II
 Exact Cross
1st Essen
 2nd Pétange
 3rd Otegem

References

External links

Gerben Kuypers at Cyclocross 24

2000 births
Living people
Belgian male cyclists
Cyclo-cross cyclists
People from Nieuwpoort, Belgium
Cyclists from West Flanders